Moulay is also a form of the Arabic title Mulay or Lalla, a Prince du sang (Prince of the blood).

Moulay is a commune in the Mayenne department in north-western France.

See also
Communes of Mayenne

References

Communes of Mayenne
Diablintes